Those Days is a historical novel by Sunil Gangopadhyay. It was first published as a serialized novel in the Bengali literary magazine Desh. Gangopadhyay won the Sahitya Akademi Award for the novel in 1985.

The story centers around the life of Nabinkumar (character based on Kaliprasanna Singha), along with legendary historical figures including Ishwar Chandra Vidyasagar, the reformer; Michael Madhusudan Dutt, the poet; the father and son duo of Dwarkanath Tagore and Debendranath Tagore; Harish Mukherjee, the journalist; Keshab Chandra Sen, the Brahmo Samaj radical; David Hare and John Bethune, the English educationists; Dinabandhu Mitra, the playwright; Radhanath Sikdar, the mathematician; Bhudev Mukhopadhyay, the novelist; and others.

Yugantar, an Indian television series that aired on DD National in the 1980s, was based on Sei Somoy. The novel was translated into Gujarati by Uma Randeria as Nava Yugnu Parodh (2002).

References

Historical novels
Novels set in West Bengal
Indian historical novels in Bengali
Indian Bengali-language novels
Sahitya Akademi Award-winning works